On 14 March 2019, in Mumbai city of India, a part of a foot overbridge connecting north-end of Chhatrapati Shivaji Maharaj Terminus (CSMT) railway station to Badaruddin Tayabji Lane collapsed and fell on the road. Six people died and at least 30 others were injured in the accident.

Background 
The foot overbridge connects the north end of Chhatrapati Shivaji Maharaj Terminus (CSMT) railway station to Badaruddin Tayabji Lane. It is maintained by the Brihanmumbai Municipal Corporation (BMC). The structural audit and minor repairs of the foot overbridge was carried out six months before the collapse.

In July 2018, G. K. Gokhale Road overbridge in Andheri had collapsed after heavy rain resulting in death of two people. After the incident, 445 bridges were audited for the safety. In September 2017, a stampede broke out on a narrow footbridge at the  Prabhadevi railway station resulting in at least 23 deaths.

Incident 
On 14 March 2019, around 7:30 pm IST, a part of bridge collapsed on Dr. Dadabhai Naoroji Road. Due peak hours, there were a large number of vehicles on the road and people on the bridge when it collapsed. Six people died in the accident and at least 30 others were injured. The traffic on J. J. flyover going north was affected. The injured were admitted to the Saint George's Hospital and Gokuldas Tejpal Hospital. The remaining part of the foot overbridge was demolished.

Investigation 
The collapse will be investigated by the BMC and Central Railways. The preliminary report of the BMC noted that there was an improper structural audit of the foot overbridge. It also noted that the officers had no records of any supervision or inspection during its repair or audit. The structural engineer who audited the bridge and two officers of the bridge department of the BMC were arrested and the complaints against them were filed by the police.

See also
 2022 Morbi bridge collapse

References

2019 disasters in India
2019 in Maharashtra
2010s in Mumbai
March 2019 events in India
Bridge disasters in India
2019 road incidents
History of Mumbai (1947–present)